Chandanada Gombe is a 1979 Indian Kannada-language film directed by Dorai–Bhagavan, and is based on the novel of the same name written by T. R. Subba Rao. The film stars Anant Nag, Lakshmi and Lokesh. It was a musical blockbuster with all the songs composed by Rajan–Nagendra considered evergreen hits. Chandanada Gombe repeated the success of the earlier movie Na Ninna Bidalaare where Anant Nag and Lakshmi acted together for the first time. The success of the movie made Anant Nag and Lakshmi as a household name across Karnataka. The film was remade in Telugu as Ramapuramlo Seetha starring Sujatha in the title role.

Plot
Chandanada Gombe is a simple love story. Anant Nag is a landlord. Lakshmi's father is a school teacher who is struggling to find a bridegroom for Lakshmi. They get married with the help of relatives. Anant Nag unfortunately dies in an accident. The rest of the story continues about the life of a struggling widow and her child in a traditional society amid village politics.

Cast 
 Anant Nag as Seetharamu
 Lakshmi as Ratna
 Lokesh as Chinnappa
Sampath as Srinivasaiah, Seetharamu's Maternal Uncle
Advani Lakshmi Devi as Kamalamma, Srinivasaiah's Wife
 K. S. Ashwath as Lakshman Rao, Ratna's Father
 Savitri as Sita, Ratna's Mother
 Shanthamma as Chinnappa's Mother
 Uma Shivakumar as Eeramma, Shop-keeper
Sundar Raj as Raghavendra, Seetharamu's Cousin
 Mysore Lokesh as Vithobha

Soundtrack 

The film score and soundtrack was composed by Rajan–Nagendra, with its lyrics penned by Chi. Udaya Shankar. The soundtrack album consists of four tracks.

Awards
Karnataka State Film Awards

 Third Best Film
 Best supporting actress — Uma Shivakumar

References

External links 
 

1979 films
Indian drama films
1970s Kannada-language films
Films scored by Rajan–Nagendra
Films based on Indian novels
Kannada films remade in other languages
Films directed by Dorai–Bhagavan